Brian Balogh is an American historian, and professor at the University of Virginia. Balogh is the director of the National Fellowship Program hosted by the Jefferson Scholars Foundation. He also co-hosts the radio program, "Backstory with the American History Guys". In 2015, he received a Nancy Lyman Roelker Award.

Education 
He graduated from Harvard University, and from Johns Hopkins University.

Works 
 
 
 
 
 *

References

External links 
 https://millercenter.org/experts/brian-balogh
 http://www.backstoryradio.org/
 

Living people
University of Virginia faculty
Harvard University alumni
Johns Hopkins University alumni
21st-century American historians
21st-century American male writers
Year of birth missing (living people)
Place of birth missing (living people)
American male non-fiction writers